Fauna Japonica is a series of monographs on the zoology of Japan. It was the first book written in a European language (French) on the Japanese fauna, and published serially in five volumes between 1833 and 1850.

Based on the collections made by Philipp Franz von Siebold (who edited the text) and his successor Heinrich Bürger in Japan, Fauna Japonica's vertebrate volumes were authored by the Leyden Museum naturalists Coenraad Jacob Temminck and Hermann Schlegel. Wilhem de Haan, also at the Leyden museum wrote the invertebrate volumes assisted by the Japanese artist naturalists Keiga Kawahara, Kurimoto Masayoshi and others. The volumes were a rare chance for European naturalists to learn about the wildlife in isolationist Japan.

Publication 
The 5 volumes that make up Fauna Japonica were published by P. F. von Siebold and Lugduni Batavorum between 1833 and 1850. Originally intended to include all Japanese fauna, the published volumes pertain to Vertebrates and Crustacea only. Though a lot of the content was based on his own collections of specimen, von Siebold was the editor and publisher, not the writer of Fauna Japonica. C. J. Temminck and H. Schlegel authored the Vertebrata volumes, for which von Siebold did write an introduction, and W. de Haan wrote the volume on the Crustacea. While an 1849 letter between Temminck, then director of the Leiden Museum, and the Netherlands Ministry of Internal Affairs, indicates that J. A. Herklots studied the other invertebrates in von Siebold's collection, no volume of his was published in this series.

Dating Difficulties 
The publication of the each volume was done in the form of several fascicles called "Decades" over many years. This process poses many problems for modern scientists trying to keep track of the nomenclature of Japanese wildlife, because both text and plates often introduced nomenclature and described new taxa with inconsistent priority. For example, the volume devoted to bird, "Aves," was published in 12 livraisons ("deliveries" in French). The problem is or special concern for de Haan's Crustacea volume, in which many new genera and species were described. The problem arises because of uncertain dating on each component of these volumes. For a sense of how widley dispersed in time the publication of even a single volume can be, the following table records the different dates of publication for the different "Decades" of the first volume of Fauna Japonica, Crustacea.

Reception 
Fauna Japonica  was considered important for its comprehensiveness, specifically of relevance to carcinologists. The Crustacea volume especially is consulted by those researching Decapods and Stomatopods. The work was influential on Philipp Franz von Siebold's reputation as a scientist in Europe and Japan. Numerous reprints and facsimiles have been issued since, some including unpublished artwork by collaborator Keiga Kawahara. Von Siebold's collection is now housed at the Horus Botanicus Leiden, the botanical garden in Leiden.

References

External links

Digitised volumes in the Biodiversity Heritage Library
Kyoto University Library

Zoology books
Monographic series
19th-century books
French-language books
Books about Japan
Natural history books
Natural history of Japan